, abbreviated as , is a Japanese manga series written and illustrated by Tamiki Wakaki. It was originally serialized in Shogakukan's Weekly Shōnen Sunday from April 2008 to April 2014, with its chapters collected in 26 tankōbon volumes. The manga was adapted into three anime television series produced by Manglobe, which were broadcast in Japan from October 2010 to September 2013. In North America, the anime series were licensed for English release by Sentai Filmworks.

Plot

Keima Katsuragi, a second-year high school student, is an avid player of gal games (video games that involve interactions with anime-styled pretty girls).

At the start of the series, Keima receives an e-mail offering him a contract to "conquer" girls and, thinking it is an invitation to a game challenge, he accepts. In response, a cute demon from Hell named Elsie appears: a Spirit Hunter. She asks for his cooperation to help her in catching the evil spirits that have escaped to the Human Realm: the "Loose Souls", which were once Old Demons from Hell. These evil spirits hide themselves inside the hearts of girls, feeding off the hosts' negative emotions to replenish their power and strength, thus becoming whole demons once again (and in turn, the host becomes an empty shell of a person). Elsie suggests that the only method to force the evil spirits out is by "conquering" the girls' hearts, making them fall in love with him and filling up the gaps which the escaped evil spirits hide in, in which she is then able to capture them. Interested only in video game girls, however, Keima is appalled by the idea, and refuses the assignment as he has no romantic real life experiences whatsoever. Nevertheless, with the contract already agreed, Keima has no choice but to help Elsie no matter what, as they will be beheaded by an invisible (to others) purple collar around their necks if they fail.

After winning the hearts of fourteen girls (and capturing the spirits residing in them), Keima and Elsie are given an even greater mission: to awaken the six goddesses known as the Jupiter Sisters. Each sister is dormant in the heart of a girl among those they have previously helped, thus Keima must locate them and conquer their hearts a second time. This time however, they remember the encounters he has had with them already, due to the goddesses inside them, causing high tension and constant possible failure as he tries to conquer the girls simultaneously. However, his time is limited as a rebel demon faction called "Vintage" is planning to capture the goddesses and take over the world. After Vintage's plans are thwarted, Keima starts seeing visions of a child who is somewhat familiar to him. The goddesses send Keima and Elsie to the past with the task of helping her. Upon arriving, they team up with a mysterious girl who apparently has some connection with Dokuro, Elsie's superior in the underworld, and Keima discovers that several occurrences in the past are different from what he remembers, leading to a tragic chain of events that he must avert to ensure that the present stays unaltered, as well as another demon faction which releases giant humanoid monsters. As Keima completes his final mission, he discovers the truth about one of the giants and is able to reconcile with it. He is relieved from the collar and returns to his normal life in the real world.

Development
The World God Only Knows was authored by Tamiki Wakaki. He cited the 1996 visual novel YU-NO: A Girl Who Chants Love at the Bound of this World as an influence on the manga.

Media

Manga

The World God Only Knows is written and illustrated by Tamiki Wakaki, serialized in the Japanese manga magazine Weekly Shōnen Sunday April 9, 2008 and April 23, 2014. Wakaki created a prototype version of the story which debuted as a one-shot in Weekly Shōnen Sunday 2007 Issue #32 and was titled, . Shogakukan compiled its chapters in twenty-six tankōbon volumes, released from July 11, 2008 to June 18, 2014.

The series is licensed in South Korea by Haksan Culture Company, and the first two volumes of the series were simultaneously released on August 2009 with a limited edition supplement for each.

A 3-chapter spin-off series, titled , portraying Kanon Nakagawa as a magical girl, ran in Weekly Shōnen Sunday from March 13 to March 27, 2013. The series was published along with additional chapters in a book, bundled with the limited edition of the 21st volume of the main series, released on April 16, 2013. Another spin-off series, titled , was serialized on the Club Sunday website in 2014. It was later released into a single volume with three additional previously published chapters on July 17, 2015.

Light novel
A light novel entitled , written by Mamizu Arisawa and illustrated by Tamiki Wakaki, was released on May 19, 2009, published by Shogakukan under their Gagaga Bunko label. The novel features a completely original story, disparate from the series, with original novel characters. A second light novel entitled  was released on May 18, 2010.

Anime

The anime adaptation was officially announced in the issue #19 of Shogakukan's Weekly Shōnen Sunday in April 2010. It was announced that script writer Hideyuki Kurata, character designer Watanabe Akio, and director Shigehito Takayanagi would be working on the project. The studio in charge of the animation was Manglobe. On September 18, 2010, Crunchyroll announced the anime would be streaming online on their site. The anime aired on TV Tokyo from October 6 to December 22, 2010, with the second season airing from April 11 to June 28, 2011. The third season, titled , aired on TV Tokyo from July 8 to September 23, 2013, and was simulcast on Crunchyroll.

At Anime Weekend Atlanta 2011, Sentai Filmworks announced that they have licensed both seasons of the anime in North America and released the first season on DVD and Blu-ray Disc in January 2012.

Original video animations
A prologue OVA episode was released and bundled together with the tenth manga volume on September 17, 2010. A second OVA episode, titled , was released on a DVD, bundled together with the fourteenth manga volume on September 16, 2011. A third OVA, titled , was released in two parts with the 19th and 20th volumes of the manga, on October 16 and December 18, 2012. A spin-off OVA based on the character Kanon was announced in the 2013 combined #2–3 issue of Shogakukan's Weekly Shōnen Sunday magazine. The spin-off is titled  and was released bundled with the 22nd volume of the manga on June 18, 2013.

Reception
The third volume of The World God Only Knows was the fourth highest-selling tankōbon in Japan on the Oricon Comic Chart for the week of January 13 and January 19, 2009, with over 50,500 copies sold that week. The following week, it was the twenty-first highest-selling manga volume in Japan, having sold 30,600 copies the week of January 20 and January 26, 2009. As of January 2009, the third manga volume have sold about 81,100 copies.

Carlo Santos of Anime News Network reviewed the anime's first season and gave it a B where he was surprised how much he enjoyed the great storyline despite its plot description alone might be off putting to some saying, "By most expectations, anything involving ditzy demon girls and gaming-obsessed geekboys and a rotating lineup of high school beauties should have been the stuff of critical derision. Yet the show's sharp sense of humor, honest emotions, and polished production values prove that working with the right prodding and poking, any anime series can indeed become greater than the sum of its parts." In a 2019 Forbes article about the best anime of the 2010s decade, Lauren Orsini considered it to be one of the five best anime of 2010; she wrote, "What makes this show a standout of its genre is Keima's individuality; he's not a viewer stand-in, but an interesting and flawed character in his own right. Sharp production values and creative character design make this show a visual and audio treat".

Notes

References

External links
00The World That Only God Knows00 at Web Sunday 
The World That God Only Knows anime official website 

The World God Only Knows
2008 manga
2009 Japanese novels
2010 anime television series debuts
2011 anime OVAs
2011 anime television series debuts
2012 anime OVAs
2013 anime television series debuts
Cross-dressing in anime and manga
Harem anime and manga
Gagaga Bunko
Hideyuki Kurata
Light novels
Manglobe
NBCUniversal Entertainment Japan
Romantic comedy anime and manga
School life in anime and manga
Sentai Filmworks
Shogakukan manga
Shōnen manga
Supernatural anime and manga
TV Tokyo original programming